In human reproduction, a live birth occurs when a fetus exits the mother showing any definite sign of life such as voluntary movement, heartbeat, or pulsation of the umbilical cord, for however brief a time and regardless of whether the umbilical cord or placenta are intact. After the fetus is expelled from the maternal body it is called a neonate. Whether the birth is vaginal or by Caesarean section, and whether the neonate is ultimately viable, is irrelevant.

The definition of the term "live birth" was created by the World Health Organization in 1950, and is chiefly used for public health and statistical purposes. However, the term "live birth" was in common use long before 1950.

In the United States, the term "born alive" is defined by federal law known as the born alive rule. Live births are recorded on a U.S. Standard Certificate of Live Birth, also known as a birth certificate. The United States recorded 3,605,201 live births in 2020 which is a 4% decrease from 2019 and the 6th consecutive year of decline in births.

Not all pregnancies result in live births. A woman may choose to end her pregnancy by abortion. Miscarriage, also known as spontaneous abortion and pregnancy loss, is the natural death of an embryo or fetus before it is able to survive independently. Some use the cutoff of 20 weeks of gestation, after which fetal death is known as a stillbirth. The death of the fetus or neonate at the end of the pregnancy, during labour and delivery, or just after birth is counted as perinatal mortality.

Statistical significance

Factors affecting viability

Gestational age 
Measured in weeks, gestational age is a term used to describe how far along a pregnancy is starting from the first day of the woman's last menstrual cycle to the current date. A baby born "at term" is between the gestational age of 37 weeks to 41 weeks. A preterm baby is born before the gestational age of 37 weeks. A pregnancy that lasts 41 weeks up to 42 weeks is called late-term and a pregnancy longer than 42 weeks is called post-term. The general consensus is that a fetus is viable at 24 weeks, however, a live birth may occur earlier in gestation with the assistance from neonatal intensive care unit (NICU) resources. Gestational age is the main determinant of whether a baby will be able to live and survive outside of the uterus.

Other factors 
While gestational age is the most significant predictor of fetal viability, the condition of the neonate at birth also significantly indicates how well it tolerates life outside of the mother. Factors measured at birth include birth weight, head circumference, and body length. An Apgar score is given at the time of birth to report the status of the newborn infant and the response to resuscitation if needed.

Recovery 
The maternal recovery period directly following the events of human childbirth, regardless of whether it is a live birth, is called the postpartum period.

Neonate

Birthing child

Complications

Society and culture

History

Special cases 
There is one case report of a woman having a live birth derived from a frozen embryo obtained before she began cancer treatment.

See also
Maternal death
Childbirth

References 

Obstetrics
Demography
Midwifery
Infancy
Reproduction in mammals
Childbirth